Aleksandr Genrikhovich Borodyuk (born 30 November 1962) is a Russian football manager and former international player for USSR (playing one match in 1990 FIFA World Cup) and Russia (appearing twice in the 1994 edition).

Playing career
Born in Voronezh, Borodyuk attended the Fakel Voronezh football school and spent one season with their senior team. He was conscripted to play for Dynamo Vologda, where he began playing football in the Soviet Second League, and transferred to FC Dynamo Moscow a year later. When the conscription term ended, Borodyuk stayed in Moscow and later achieved the rank of junior lieutenant. With Dynamo he won the Soviet Cup in 1984 and became the top scorer of the Soviet League in 1986 and 1988. Valery Gazzaev, Igor Dobrovolsky and Igor Kolyvanov were among his teammates.

In 1988, Borodyuk became Olympic champion. After Anatoly Byshovets became the manager of Dynamo, Borodyuk lost his place in the starting line-up and moved to Germany to play for FC Schalke 04, achieving promotion to the Bundesliga and ranking among the club league's topscorers from 1989 to 1993. In January 1994, however, he moved to SC Freiburg and finished third in the league in 1994–95, although he appeared in only seven league contests. In October 1995, Borodyuk changed sides again, joining 2. Bundesliga's Hannover 96. He scored the 30,000th goal in the Bundesliga.

Borodyuk returned to Russia at the age of 34 and was invited to FC Lokomotiv Moscow by Yuri Semin. With Lokomotiv he reached the semifinal of the UEFA Cup and won the Russian Cup in 1997. After stints with Torpedo-ZIL Moscow and Krylia Sovetov Samara, he retired aged 38, as a member of the Grigory Fedotov club.

Managerial career
As a manager, Borodyuk began working as assistant coach, first with Aleksandr Tarkhanov in Krylia Sovetov, then with Georgi Yartsev in the Russia national team.

He was caretaker manager of the Russia national team from 6 December 2005 to June 2006, also serving as manager of Russia U21 team from December 2005 to February 2007. In February 2007 he became Guus Hiddink's assistant, as Boris Stukalov took the reins of the U-21s. When Hiddink was replaced by Dick Advocaat in 2010, Borodyuk remained the assistant with the team.

On 28 December 2015, Borodyuk was appointed as manager of FC Kairat, resigning on 5 April 2016 after a poor start to the season. In February 2017, Borodyuk became the manager of Kazakhstan national team, signing a three-year contract.

On 11 August 2020, he was hired by Austrian Football Second League club SV Horn. He was released from his contract on 23 September 2020 after just two games were played in the league season.

On 23 March 2021, he returned to Torpedo Moscow, now in the second-tier Russian Football National League. During his previous time in Torpedo, he led them to promotion to the Russian Premier League. Under his management, Torpedo won the 2021–22 Russian Football National League to secure the return to the Premier League on 21 May 2022. Torpedo only gained 1 point in their first 5 games after the return to the Premier League, and on 18 August 2022, Borodyuk left Torpedo by mutual consent.

Managerial statistics

Honours

As a player
Soviet Union
 Olympic Gold medal : 1988
Dynamo Moscow
 Soviet Cup : 1984
Schalke 04
 2. Bundesliga : 1991
Lokomotiv Moscow
 Russian Cup : 1997

As a coach
Kaïrat Almaty
 Kazakhstan Super Cup : 2016
Torpedo Moscow
 Russian Football National League : 2021-22

References

External links
 Player profile 
 National team data at rsssf.com

1962 births
Living people
Russian people of Ukrainian descent
Footballers from Voronezh
Soviet footballers
Russian footballers
Soviet Union international footballers
Russia international footballers
FC Dynamo Moscow players
FC Schalke 04 players
SC Freiburg players
Hannover 96 players
FC Lokomotiv Moscow players
FC Moscow players
PFC Krylia Sovetov Samara players
Russian football managers
Olympic footballers of the Soviet Union
Footballers at the 1988 Summer Olympics
1990 FIFA World Cup players
1994 FIFA World Cup players
Olympic gold medalists for the Soviet Union
Russia national football team managers
Soviet Top League players
Russian Premier League players
Bundesliga players
2. Bundesliga players
Expatriate footballers in Germany
Soviet expatriate footballers
Russian expatriate footballers
Dual internationalists (football)
Olympic medalists in football
FC Torpedo Moscow managers
Honoured Coaches of Russia
FC Kairat managers
Russian expatriate football managers
Expatriate football managers in Kazakhstan
Russian expatriate sportspeople in Kazakhstan
Medalists at the 1988 Summer Olympics
Association football midfielders
Association football forwards
Kazakhstan national football team managers
FC Fakel Voronezh players
FC Dynamo Vologda players
SV Horn managers
Expatriate football managers in Austria
Soviet expatriate sportspeople in West Germany
Expatriate footballers in West Germany
Russian expatriate sportspeople in Germany
Russian expatriate sportspeople in Austria